In Europe, the United States, and other countries, an Aviation Medical Examiner or Aero-medical Examiner (AME) is a physician designated by the local aviation authority and given the authority to perform flight physical examinations and issue aviation medical certificates. AMEs are practitioners of aviation medicine, although most are also qualified in other medical specialties.

The International Civil Aviation Organization (ICAO) have established basic medical rules for determining whether a pilot or an air traffic controller is fit to act in that capacity, and they are codified in Annex 1 to the Convention on International Civil Aviation. However, most countries' aviation authorities have developed their own specific details and clarifications to be used in addition to – frequently more stringently than – the high-level standards prescribed by ICAO.

The military equivalent of the AME is the flight surgeon.

AMEs in the United States
AMEs are private physicians, not employees of the Federal Aviation Authority ( FAA). Interested physicians apply through their regional flight surgeon's office. If selected and authorized, they are trained through a national process. A pilot can go to any examiner from a list of designated doctors and undergo an examination at any time. New AMEs are designated based upon the local demand for aeromedical certification services.

All AMEs may issue second-class or third-class certificates. Some AMEs are designated "senior aviation medical examiner", and may issue first-class certificates, which are required for pilots flying in air carrier operations. An AME can no longer issue combined medical/student pilot certificates as the FAA now issues separate student pilot certificates as of April 1, 2016.

As of 2008, the FAA had approximately 3,927 civilian AME's located in 9 regions, 291 international AMEs located in 81 countries, and 350 federal AMEs (military, U.S. Coast Guard, NASA, and other agencies).  The average age of American AME's is almost 60 years old and only 10% that serve are female.

AMEs in the Joint Aviation Authorities area 

Member countries of the Joint Aviation Authorities in Europe issue their own medical certificates. Most now do so according to the established guidance provided by JAR-FCL 3 (Medical), in a similar arrangement to the US whereby the local aviation authority in each country appoints AMEs.

The JAA regulations prescribe two standards of medical certificate. Class 2 is required for private flying on a PPL and the more stringent class 1 is for professional pilots (CPL or ATPL). An initial Class 1 medical examination must be performed by the Aeromedical Centre (AMC) of the country which will issue the license, but may be renewed by any suitably authorized AME.

Medical regulation in the JAA area is expected to gradually change in or after 2008 as the European Aviation Safety Agency takes over responsibility.

References

External links
 Aerospace Medical Association
 AME Locator and Expanded information on FAA Flight Physicals
 FAA information on medical certification
 Aviation Medical Examiner Directory
 Medical branch of the Safety Regulation Group of the UK Civil Aviation Authority
 ICAO Aviation Medicine publications

Aviation medicine
Federal Aviation Administration